Salavan may refer to:
 Salavan Province, Laos
 Salavan (district), Laos
 Salavan (city), Laos

See also
 Saravan (disambiguation)